Aisam-ul-Haq Qureshi and Jean-Julien Rojer were the defending champions, but lost in the first round to Kei Nishikori and Milos Raonic.
Santiago González and Scott Lipsky won the title, defeating Daniele Bracciali and Jonathan Erlich in the final, 6–2, 7–6(7–3).

Seeds

Draw

Draw

External links
 Main draw

2013 Gerry Weber Open